The Buryats are a Mongolic ethnic group native to southeastern Siberia who speak the Buryat language. They are one of the two largest indigenous groups in Siberia, the other being the Yakuts. The majority of the Buryats today live in their titular homeland, the Republic of Buryatia, a federal subject of Russia which sprawls along the southern coast and partially straddles the Lake Baikal. Smaller groups of Buryats also inhabit Ust-Orda Buryat Okrug (Irkutsk Oblast) and the  Agin-Buryat Okrug (Zabaykalsky Krai) which are to the west and east of Buryatia respectively as well as northeastern Mongolia and Inner Mongolia, China. They traditionally formed the major northern subgroup of the Mongols.

Buryats share many customs with other Mongols, including nomadic herding, and erecting gers for shelter. Today the majority of Buryats live in and around Ulan-Ude, the capital of the Buryat Republic, although many still follow a more traditional lifestyle in the countryside. They speak a central Mongolic language called Buryat. UNESCO's 2010 edition of the Atlas of the World's Languages in Danger classifies the Buryat language as "severely endangered".

History

It is most likely that the ancestors of modern Buryats are Bayyrku and Kurykans who were part of the tribal union of the Tiele. The Tiele, in turn, came from the Dingling. The first information about Dingling appeared in sources from the 2nd century BC. The name "Buriyad" is mentioned as one of the forest people for the first time in The Secret History of the Mongols (possibly 1240). It says Jochi, the eldest son of Genghis Khan, marched north to subjugate the Buryats in 1207. the Buryats lived along the Angara River and its tributaries at this time. Meanwhile, their component, Barga, appeared both west of Baikal and in northern Buryatia's Barguzin valley. Linked also to the Bargas were the Khori-Tumed along the Arig River in eastern Khövsgöl Province and the Angara. A Tumad rebellion broke out in 1217, when Genghis Khan allowed his viceroy to seize 30 Tumad maidens. Genghis Khan's commander Dorbei the Fierce of the Dörbeds smashed them in response. The Buryats joined the Oirats challenging the imperial rule of the Eastern Mongols during the Northern Yuan period in the late 14th century.

Historically, the territories around Lake Baikal belonged to Mongolia, Buryats were subject to Tüsheet Khan and Setsen Khan of Khalkha Mongolia. When the Russians expanded into Transbaikalia (eastern Siberia) in 1609, the Cossacks found only a small core of tribal groups speaking a Mongol dialect called Buryat and paying tribute to the Khalkha. However, they were powerful enough to compel the Ket and Samoyed peoples on the Kan and the Evenks on the lower Angara to pay tribute. The ancestors of most modern Buryats were speaking a variety of Turkic-Tungusic dialects at that time. In addition to genuine Buryat-Mongol tribes (Bulagad, Khori, Ekhired, Khongoodor) that merged with the Buryats, the Buryats also assimilated other groups, including some Oirats, the Khalkha, Tungus (Evenks) and others. The Khori-Barga had migrated out of the Barguzin eastward to the lands between the Greater Khingan and the Argun. Around 1594, most of them fled back to the Aga and Nerchinsk in order to escape subjection by the Daurs.

The Russians reached Lake Baikal in 1643 but the Buryats resisted them and their forces. The Buryats were defeated, though they attempted to revolt a few times. These revolts were suppressed. The territory and people were formally annexed to the Russian state by treaties in 1689 and 1727, when the territories on both the sides of Lake Baikal were separated from Mongolia.

Consolidation of modern Buryat tribes and groups took place under the conditions of the Russian state. From the middle of the 17th century to the beginning of the 20th century, the Buryat population increased from 77,000 (27,700–60,000) to 300,000. Another estimate of the rapid growth in people referring to themselves as Buryat is based on the clan list names paying tribute in the form of a sable-skin tax. This indicates a population of about 77,000 in 1640 rising to 157,000 in 1823 and more than a million by 1950.

The historical roots of the Buryat culture are related to the Mongolic peoples. After Buryatia was incorporated into Russia, it was exposed to two traditions – Buddhism and Orthodox Christianity. Buryats west of Lake Baikal and Olkhon (Irkut Buryats), are more "Russified", and they soon abandoned nomadism for agriculture, whereas the eastern (Transbaikal) Buryats are closer to the Khalkha, may live in yurts and are mostly Buddhists. In 1741, the Tibetan branch of Buddhism was recognized as one of the official religions in Russia, and the first Buryat datsan (Buddhist monastery) was built.

The second half of the 19th century and the beginning of the 20th century was a time of growth for the Buryat Buddhist religion (48 datsans in Buryatia in 1914). Buddhism became an important factor in the cultural development of Buryatia. Because of their skills in horsemanship and mounted combat, many were enlisted into the Amur Cossacks host. During the Russian Civil War most of the Buryats sided with the White forces of Baron Ungern-Sternberg and Ataman Semenov. They formed a sizable portion of Ungern's forces and often received favorable treatment when compared with other ethnic groups in the Baron's army. After the Revolution, most of the lamas were loyal to Soviet power. In 1925, a battle against religion and clergy in Buryatia began. Datsans were gradually closed down and the activity of the clergy was curtailed. Consequently, in the late 1930s the Buddhist clergy ceased to exist and thousands of cultural treasures were destroyed. Attempts to revive Buddhism started during World War II, and it was officially re-established in 1946. A revival of Buddhism has taken place since the late 1980s as an important factor in the national consolidation.

In the 1930s, Buryat-Mongolia was one of the sites of Soviet studies aimed to disprove Nazi race theories. Among other things, Soviet physicians studied the "endurance and fatigue levels" of Russian, Buryat-Mongol, and Russian-Buryat-Mongol workers to prove that all three groups were equally able.

In 1923, the Buryat-Mongol Autonomous Soviet Socialist Republic was formed and included Baikal province (Pribaykalskaya guberniya) with Russian population. The Buryats rebelled against the communist rule and collectivization of their herds in 1929. The rebellion was quickly crushed by the Red Army with loss of 35,000 Buryats. The Buryat refugees fled to Mongolia and resettled, however, only a few of them joined the Shambala rebellion there. In 1937, in an effort to disperse Buryats, Stalin's government separated a number of counties (raions) from the Buryat-Mongol Autonomous Soviet Socialist Republic and formed Ust-Orda Buryat Autonomous Okrug and Agin-Buryat Autonomous Okrug; at the same time, some raions with Buryat populations were left out. Fearing Buryat nationalism, Joseph Stalin had more than 10,000 Buryats killed. Moreover, Stalinist purge of Buryats spread into Mongolia, known as the incident of L'humbee.

In 1958, the name "Mongol" was removed from the name of the republic (Buryat ASSR). Also around 1958, the Mongolian script was banned and replaced by Cyrillic. BASSR declared its sovereignty in 1990 and adopted the name Republic of Buryatia in 1992. The constitution of the Republic was adopted by the People's Khural in 1994, and a bilateral treaty with the Russian Federation was signed in 1995.

Culture and traditions

Relationship with nature
The Buryat national tradition is ecological by origin in that the religious and mythological ideas of the Buryat people have been based on a theology of nature. The environment has traditionally been deeply respected by Buryats due to the nomadic way of life and religious culture. The harsh climatic conditions of the region have in turn created a fragile balance between humans, society and the environment itself. This has led to a delicate approach to nature, oriented not towards its conquest but rather towards a harmonious interaction and equal partnership with it. A synthesis of Buddhism and traditional beliefs that formed a system of ecological traditions has thus constituted a major attribute of Buryat eco-culture.

Kinship and marriage
Prior to the arrival of the Russians, Buryats lived in semi-nomadic groups scattered across the steppes. Kinship was immensely important in Buryat society, both in spiritual and social terms. All Buryats traced their lineage to a single mythical individual, with the particular ancestor varying based upon geographical region. Kinship also determined proximity, as neighbours were nearly always related. Groups of relatives that inhabited the same grazing land organized themselves into clans based on genealogy. While coalitions between clans did occur, they were infrequent and often relied on looser interpretations of kinship and relations.

Marriage was arranged by the family, at times occurring as early as one to two years old. A unique aspect of traditional Buryat marriage was the kalym, an exchange that combined both bride wealth and a dowry. Kalym involved a husband exchanging an agreed number of head of cattle for his bride, while the bride's family would provide dowry in the form of a yurt and other essential household goods. If a husband did not have enough cattle, a period of bride service would be arranged. Polygamy was permitted, however only men of extreme wealth could afford the price of multiple wives. Marriage ceremonies involved rituals such as the bride stoking the fire in the grooms tent with three pieces of fat, and sprinkling fat upon the clothing of the groom's father.

The arrival of the Russians saw drastic changes to the way kalym system worked. Money became a significant part of the exchange. Over time, the price of a bride significantly increased to the point where "in the 1890s, bride price involved '400 to 600 rubles' in addition to 86–107 head of livestock, when 70 years earlier only the wealthiest Western Buryats gave 100 heads (of cattle)." As the situation worsened, many men engaged in multi-year work contracts with wealthy herd-owners under the promise their employer would aid them in gaining a wife. Later on, the kalym system fell out of favour, and was replaced by marriages arrangements based upon courtship and romantic feelings.

Religion
Religion today in the Republic of Buryatia is primarily divided between Russian Orthodoxy, Buddhism, and irreligious. Shamanism has undergone a revival in rural areas since Soviet repression, however it is still small. Those involved practise either Yellow, Black, or a mixture of the two.

Shamanism (Tengrism) 

Buryats traditionally practised shamanism, also called Tengrism, with a focus on worship of nature. A core concept of Buryat shamanism is the "triple division" of the physical and spiritual world. There are three divisions within the spirit world: the tengeri, the bōxoldoy, and lower spirits. These spirits are the supreme rulers of mankind, the spirits of commoners, and the spirits of slaves respectively. In parallel to this is the concept that man is divided into three parts: the body (beye), the "breath and life" of a man, and the soul. The soul is further divided into three parts: first, second, and third. The first soul is contained within the entirety of the physical skeleton, and that damage to it damages the soul. Rituals involving the sacrifice of animals involve great care not to damage the bones, lest the deity receiving the offering reject it. The second soul is believed to have the power to leave the body, transform into other beings, and is stored in the organs. The third soul is similar to the second, differing only in that its passing marks the end of one's life.

The number three and multiples of it are deeply sacred to the Buryat. Examples of this numerology include three major yearly sacrifices, shamans prolonging the lives of the sick by three or nine years, the total number of tengeri being 99, and countless other examples.

Shamans are divided into two classes: "great" shamans of arctic regions and "little" shamans from the taiga. Shamans often are associated with nervous disorders, and in some cases are prone to seizure. Shamans can also be divided into "White" shamans that summon good spirits and "Black" shamans that summon malicious ones. Yellow shamanism refers to shamanistic practices that have been heavily influenced by Buddhism. Shamans exist to heal, especially in regards to psychological illnesses. Buryat shamanism is not necessarily hereditary, and other members of the kinship-group can receive the calling (however, shamans do keep records of their lineage, and a descendant is preferred). Shamans could both control and be controlled by spirits.

There are variations in belief between different traditional groups, so there is no consensus on beliefs and practices. For example, Western Buryats along the Kuda river believe in reincarnation of the third soul, likely a result of their exposure to Buddhism.

Buddhism 

A majority of the Buryats are followers of Buddhism. The Buryats converted to Tibetan Buddhism in the early eighteenth century under the influence of Tibetan and Mongolian missionaries.

Other religions 
A small minority of Buryats are converts to Christianity. The earliest Orthodox mission was established in Irkutsk in 1731. Some Buryats converted to Christianity for material incentives while others were forcefully converted. Despite its presence in the area, Christianity is not perceived as a "Buryat" religion.

Subsistence
Traditionally, the Buryats were semi-nomadic pastoralists. Buryat nomads tended herds of cattle, sheep, goats, and camels. Buryats also relied greatly on local resources to supplement their diets. Following colonization by Russia, pastoralism was gradually replaced by agriculture. The Buryat of today are largely agrarian but most in rural areas still focus on raising livestock as their main way of surviving.

The Buryats located in Siberia are still largely focused on raising livestock due to the shortness of the growing season. They focus on the raising of dairy cattle and the growing of berries to sustain most of their diet. There are also some communities that farm various types of trees and cash crops such as wheat and rye. On the slopes of the Sayan and Altai Mountains, there are communities whose way of life is breeding reindeer.

Mongolian Buryats are farmers as well but are typically semi-settled. They build sheds and fences to keep livestock contained and use hay as their main source of food for the livestock. However, the Buryats located in Buryatia are more focused on the agriculture aspect of farming and not the livestock raising aspect.

Traditional medicine 
Buryat healing practices incorporates folk shamanic traditions and Tibeto-Mongolian medicine. Before the adoption of Buddhism, the Buryats relied on shamanic rituals to stop or cure pain and illness which was said to be caused by evil spirits. With the conversion to Tibetan Buddhism, Buryats incorporated Tibetan medical practices to their healing practices. Medical schools were soon established and Buryats studying in these schools learned about medical and prescription techniques. Training in treatment and diagnostics was also given in these schools. Buryats soon contributed to expanding the Tibeto-Mongolian medical literature.

Traditional Buryat medicine emphasises the use of mineral and thermal springs for healing. A balanced diet (of meat, offal, plants and herbs) and proper nutrition were recommended to cure illness. The use of herbs for medical purposes was minimal because of the lack of vegetation in the semi-deserts and dry steppes. However, Buryat healers were considered skilled in healing wounds, treating head trauma, midwifery and bone-setting. In the modern age, some practices derived from Buryat folk medicine has been incorporated into contemporary settings.

Cuisine

Buryat cuisine is very similar to Mongolian cuisine and share many dishes like buuz and khuushuur. Dairy products are an important part of the cuisine, and traditional dishes are often hearty and simple. Most main courses are usually meat based, but fish like omul is common especially around Lake Baikal.

Genetics

Mitochondrial DNA haplogroups 
The Buryats have a diverse pool of mitochondrial DNA, with about 83.7% (247/295) belonging to haplogroups of Eastern Eurasian origin or affinity and about 16.3% (48/295) belonging to haplogroups of Western Eurasian origin or affinity. The most common Eastern Eurasian mtDNA haplogroups among present-day Buryats are D4 (approximately 29% of the total Buryat population), C (approximately 16.6%), and G2a (approximately 11%). The most common Western Eurasian mtDNA haplogroups among the Buryats are H (approximately 6.8%) and U (approximately 5.4%).

Another mtDNA study of Buryats shows they have 24% (6/25) of West Eurasian maternal lineages.

Y-chromosome DNA haplogroups 
Lell et al. (2002) tested a sample of thirteen Buryat males collected in Kushun village, Nizhneudinsk District, Irkutsk Region, representing the Buryats of the Sayan-Baikal upland. The Y-chromosomes of these individuals were assigned to the following haplogroups: 6/13 = 46.2% O-M119, 3/13 = 23.1% N-Tat, 2/13 = 15.4% N-DYS7Cdel(xTat), 1/13 = 7.7% C-M48, 1/13 = 7.7% F-M89(xK-M9). This sample entirely lacks C-M407 and instead has a great proportion of O-M119; thus, it appears very different from published samples of Y-DNA collected from Buryats east of Lake Baikal.

Derenko et al. (2006) tested a sample of 238 Buryat males and found the following Y-DNA haplogroup distribution: 4/238 = 1.7% P*-92R7(xQ-DYS199/M3, R1-M173), 2/238 = 0.8% R1*-M173(xR1a-SRY1532b), 5/238 = 2.1% R1a1-M17, 3/238 = 1.3% N*-LLY22g(xTat), 45/238 = 18.9% N3-Tat, 152/238 = 63.9% C-RPS4Y/M130, 4/238 = 1.7% F*-M89(xG-M201, H-M52, I-M170, J-12f2, K-M9), 1/238 = 0.4% G-M201, 1/238 = 0.4% I-M170, 21/238 = 8.8% K*-M9(xL-M20, N-LLY22g, P-92R7). Boris Malyarchuk, Miroslava Derenko, Galina Denisova, et al. (2010) retested 217 of these 238 Buryats and found that they were 148/217 (68.2%) haplogroup C-RPS4Y711/M130, including 117/217 (53.9%) C3d-M407, 18/217 (8.3%) C3∗-M217(xC3a-M93, C3b-P39, C3c-M77, C3d-M407, C3e-P53.1, C3f-P62), and 13/217 (6.0%) C3c-M77. Fourteen of the 217 Buryats (6.5%) had STR haplotypes belonging to the “star cluster" in C3*, from which it might be inferred that they most likely belonged to C2a1a3-P369/M504.

Karafet et al. (2006) tested a sample of 81 Buryat males and found that they belonged to the following Y-DNA haplogroups: 45/81 = 55.6% C-M217(xM86), 4/81 = 4.9% C-M86, 1/81 = 1.2% G-M201, 1/81 = 1.2% J-12f2, 2/81 = 2.5% N-P43, 23/81 = 28.4% N-M178, 2/81 = 2.5% O-LINE, 3/81 = 3.7% R-M207. Karafet et al. (2018) retested the same sample of Buryat males (minus the G-M201 singleton) and found that they belonged to the following haplogroups: 4/80 = 5.0% C2a1a2a-M86, 5/80 = 6.3% C2a1a3-P369, 40/80 = 50.0% C2b1a1a1a-M407, 1/80 = 1.3% J2a1-P354(xJ2a1a-L27), 2/80 = 2.5% N1a2b1-P63(xP362), 23/80 = 28.8% N1a1a1a1a3a-P89, 2/80 = 2.5% O2a1b-JST002611, 1/80 = 1.3% R2a-M124, 1/80 = 1.3% R1a1a1b1a-Z282, 1/80 = 1.3% R1b1a1b1a1a2-P312(xL21).

Kim et al. (2011) reported the following Y-DNA haplogroup distribution in a sample of "Mongolians (Buryats)": 16/36 = 44.44% C2-M217, 1/36 = 2.78% D1a1a-M15, 1/36 = 2.78% F-M89(xK-M9), 9/36 = 25.00% N-M231, 1/36 = 2.78% O1b2-SRY465(x47z), 1/36 = 2.78% O2a-M324(xO2a1b-JST002611, O2a2-P201), 6/36 = 16.67% O2a2-P201, 1/36 = 2.78% R-M207.

Kharkov et al. (2014) examined blood samples obtained from a total of 297 ethnic Buryats, separated into eight geographical groups according to the location of sample collection: Okinsky district (N = 53) (southwest of the Republic of Buryatia, ethnoterritorial group of Oka Buryats); Dzhida (N = 31) and Kyakhta (N = 27) (south, ethnoterritorial group of Selenga Buryats); the Kizhinga (N = 64) and Eravninsky (N = 30) regions (east, ethnoterritorial group of Khorin Buryats); Kurumkan village (N = 23) (north, ethnoterritorial group of Barguzin Buryats); Ulan-Ude and Khuramsha (30 km west of Ulan-Ude) (N = 26) (ethnoterritorial group of Kudarinsk Buryats); and Aginskoe village (N = 44) (Agin–Buryat Autonomous Region of Chita, Agin Buryats). For the statistical treatment, samples from Ulan-Ude and Khuramsha village were united into one group designated as “Ulan-Ude.” The authors found significant differences among eastern Buryats (Khorin Buryats from Kizhinga and Eravninsky districts of Buryatia plus Agin Buryats from Agin-Buryat Okrug of Zabaykalsky Krai), southern and central Buryats (Selenga Buryats from Dzhida and Kyakhta plus Kudarinsk Buryats from Ulan-Ude and Khuramsha), and southwestern and northern Buryats (Oka Buryats from Okinsky district of Buryatia plus Barguzin Buryats from Kurumkan village). Similar to the Buryat samples examined by Malyarchuk et al. (2010) and Karafet et al. (2018), the southwestern and northern Buryat samples of Kharkov et al. (2014) exhibited an extremely high frequency of haplogroup C2-M407: 48/76 = 63.2% C3d-M407, 14/76 = 18.4% N1c1-Tat, 4/76 = 5.3% O3a3c*-M134(xM117), 3/76 = 3.9% C3*-M217(xM77, M86, M407), 2/76 = 2.6% C3c-M77/M86, 2/76 = 2.6% O3a3c1-M117, 2/76 = 2.6% R1a1a-M17, 1/76 = 1.3% N1b-P43. In contrast, the eastern Buryat samples of Kharkov et al. (2014) exhibited an extremely high frequency of haplogroup N-Tat: 102/138 = 73.9% N1c1-Tat, 19/138 = 13.8% C3d-M407, 5/138 = 3.6% C3c-M77/M86, 4/138 = 2.9% E, 3/138 = 2.2% C3*-M217(xM77, M86, M407), 2/138 = 1.4% R1a1a-M17, 1/138 = 0.7% O3a*-M324(xM7, M134), 1/138 = 0.7% O3a3c1-M117, 1/138 = 0.7% R2a-M124. The southern and central Buryat samples of Kharkov et al. (2014) exhibited a significant proportion of C3*-M217(xM77, M86, M407), which may be related to Y-DNA subclades that often have been observed among Mongols in Mongolia, while also exhibiting both N-Tat and C-M407 with moderate frequency: 26/84 = 31.0% N1c1-Tat, 19/84 = 22.6% C3d-M407, 16/84 = 19.0% C3*-M217(xM77, M86, M407), 8/84 = 9.5% R1a1a-M17, 7/84 = 8.3% R2a-M124, 4/84 = 4.8% C3c-M77/M86, 4/84 = 4.8% O3a*-M324(xM7, M134).

Haplogroup N-M178 is found mainly among the indigenous peoples of northern Eurasia (e.g. Yakuts, Finns). Among Buryats, haplogroup N-M178 is more common toward the east (cf. 50/64 = 78.1% N1c1 in a sample of Buryat from Kizhinginsky District, 34/44 = 77.3% N1c1 in a sample of Buryat from Aga Buryatia, and 18/30 = 60.0% N1c1 in a sample of Buryat from Yeravninsky District, every one of which regions is located at a substantial distance east of the eastern shore of the southern half of Lake Baikal, versus 6/31 = 19.4% N1c1 in a sample of Buryat from Dzhidinsky District, which is slightly south of the southwestern end of the lake, and 2/23 = 8.7% N1c1 in a sample of Buryat from Kurumkansky District, which is slightly east of the northeastern end of the lake), and it mostly belongs to a subclade (N-F4205) that reaches its maximal frequency among Buryats, but which also has been found in some other Mongolic peoples as well as in Kazakhstan, Uzbekistan, Turkey, Ukraine, and Poland. N-F4205 is estimated to share a common ancestor with N-B202, which has been found in many present-day inhabitants of Chukotka, approximately 4,600 (95% CI 3,700 <-> 5,500) years before present.

Haplogroup C3d (M407) is found mainly among the northern and southwestern Buryats, Barghuts, Hamnigans, Soyots, Kazakh Khongirad, and Dörbet Kalmyks.

Nuclear DNA genetic history 
A large scale genetic study from 2021 shows that the Buryats, as well as other Mongolic ethnic groups, such as Mongols, have nearly exclusively East-Eurasian (East Asian-related) genetic ancestry (≈95% to 98%), which can be largely traced back to Neolithic millet agriculturalists of Northeast Asia, but also Paleo-Siberians, and "Yellow river farmers" from around the Yellow River region of Northern China. Genetic evidence shows that Northeast Asian like ancestry massively expanded westwards during the Bronze Age and Iron Age in several waves. Although Buryats are closer to their Mongolic and Tungusic-speaking neighbors, out of the major East Asian ethnic groups, they are genetically closest to the Koreans, followed by Northern Han, Japanese and Southern Han, in that order, according to FST genetic distance measurements.

Subgroups

According to the Buryat creation myth, there were 11 Buryat tribes or clans. According to the myth, all 11 tribes are descendants of a man and a mysterious but beautiful creature that turns into a swan during the day and a woman during the night. After the two married, the man asked her to give him her wings so that she would not turn into a swan anymore. However, it is said that after some time the woman asked for her wings back and flew away never to return. Today there are a number of different Buryat tribes, or clans.

Major tribes
Bulagad – Alagui, Gotol, Sharaldai, Bubai, Khogoi,Erkhidei, Kholtubai, Onkhotoi, Ongoy, Bulut, Barai, Yengut, Buin, Olzoy, Murui, Khulmenge, Khurkhut, Soyot, Noyot, Kharanut, Ashabagat, Abaganat, Buzgan, Dalakhai.
Khongodor – Ashkhai, Ashata, Kholsho, Uta-Baima, Dasha, Naidar, Nashan, Badarkhan, Boldoy, Terte, Shoshoolog.
Khori-Buryats – Galzut, Sharait, Khubduut, Gushit, Khuatsai, Khargana, Batanai, Bodonguut, Khudai, Sagaan, Khalbin.
Ekhirid – Shono, Khengelder, Abzay, Bayanday, Olzon, Segenut, Galzut, Kharbyat, Khaital.
Sartuul Buryats – Khorchin, Khirid, Khatagin, Saljiud, Batod, Atagan, Khorlid, Onkhod, Khoit, Uriankhai, Khereit.
Songol

Other tribes
Dzungar origin – Galzut, Segenut, Ikinat, Bukot, Zamot, Khaital, Zungar, Khuramsha.
Atagan
Khamnigan Buryats
Darkhat
Khangin
Khorchin

Notable people 

 Valéry Inkijinoff, French actor
 Balzhinima Tsyrempilov, Russian archer
 Yuriy Yekhanurov, former Prime Minister of Ukraine
 Agvan Dorjiev, Buddhist monk, tutor of the 13th Dalai Lama
 Dashi Namdakov, sculptor 
 Irina Pantaeva, model
 Yul Brynner, actor
 Orora Satoshi, sumo wrestler
 Dorzhi Banzarov, academic
Also see  List of Buryats in Russian Wikipedia for more articles.

See also
 List of indigenous peoples of Russia
 Buddhism in Russia
 Far Eastern Republic
 Shamanism in Siberia

References

Further reading

 Shimamura, Ippei. The Roots Seekers: Shamanism and Ethnicity Among the Mongol Buryats. Kanagawa, Japan: Shumpusha Publishing, 2014. .
 Ethnic groups — Buryats
 J.G. Gruelin, Siberia.
 Pierre Simon Pallas, Sammlungen historischer Nachrichten über die mongolischen Volkerschaften (St Petersburg, 1776–1802).
 M.A. Castrén, Versuch einer buriatischen Sprachlehre (1857).
 Sir H.H. Howorth, History of the Mongols (1876–1888).
 The film A Pearl in the Forest (МОЙЛХОН) illustrates the heavy price paid by the Buryats in the 1930s during the Stalinist purges.
 Murphy, Dervla (2007) "Silverland: A Winter Journey Beyond the Urals", London, John Murray
 Natalia Zhukovskaia (Ed.) Buryaty. Moskva: Nauka, 2004 (a classic general description).
 Buryat Supermodel identifies herself as Siberian Eskimo
 
 Anthology of Buryat folklore, Pushkinskiĭ dom, 2000 (CD)

External links

 
Ethnic groups in Siberia
Ethnic groups in China
Ethnic groups in Mongolia
Indigenous peoples of North Asia
Mongol peoples
Modern nomads
Irkutsk Oblast
Zabaykalsky Krai